Korskrogen, is a village in Ljusdal Municipality, Hälsingland, Gävleborg County, Sweden with about 202 inhabitants. (2004, Statistics Sweden).

Populated places in Ljusdal Municipality
Hälsingland